The Royal Albanian Infantry was from 1928 till 1939 and was part of the Royal Albanian Army.

Structure

The original plan was for the army to have three "infantry groups"(="Grupit Këmbsorisë"), each of three infantry battalions, three mountain batteries (2 x 65mm L/17), an engineer company and supporting elements such as transport, logistics and signals. Grupit I seems to have never been formed, but Grupit II and Grupit III did exist before 1939, both headquartered at Tiranë.  Apparently these were no longer constituted on April 7, and the former commander of Grupit II had by that date become commander of Zona I. 
  
In 1939 only seven  of the nine planned infantry battalions were active:
Battalion	*Recruiting Center	*Commander, 1939
Tarabosh	*Shkodër	        *Cpt. Hamdi Jusufit
Korata	        *Tiranë	 
Deja	        *Tiranë	                *Maj. Kastriot Bajraktori
Daijti	        *Tiranë	 
Kaptina	*Elbasan	 
Tomori	        *Berat	                *Maj. Sabe Gjilanit?
Gramos	        *Korçe	 
Battalions were named for mountains
A full-strength battalion (="batalion", abbreviation "Baon.")  documented partly by film footage, was organized as follows: 
Hqs 
3 infantry companies (="kompani") 
Co Hqs ca. 15-20 men 
3 platoons (= "togë") 35 men 
Platoon Leader (= "toger") 
NCO (="nëntoger") 
3 squads (="skuadra") 
NCO (="nënoficerë") 
10  corporals and soldiers 
1 machine gun company 
Plt Hqs 
3 machine gun platoons 
Plt Hqs 
4 Fiat or Schwarzelose machine guns 
battalion train 
wagons/mules 
Contrary to reports, there were no light machine guns at squad level. 
A reported strength of 21 officers, 37 NCOs and 422 corporals and privates was almost certainly the light establishment. A light establishment battalion had only two rifle companies with the third in cadre, and on paper its machine gun company had only two platoons, but in practice there were only enough machine guns in service for two platoons in any case.

Royal Albanian Army